Three ships of the Royal Navy have borne the name HMS Tartarus, after Tartarus, from Greek mythology. A fourth was laid down, but never completed:
  was an 8-gun bomb vessel, launched in 1792 at Newcastle as the mercantile Charles Dawson. The Navy purchased her in 1797. She was wrecked in 1804.
  was a 16-gun fireship launched in 1806. She was reclassified as a sloop from 1808 and was sold in 1816.
  was a  paddle gunvessel launched in 1834 and broken up in 1860.
 HMS Tartarus was to have been a  wooden screw gunvessel, laid down in 1860 and cancelled in 1864.

References

Royal Navy ship names